Malcolm Sebastian (November 4, 1923 – July 18, 2006) was an American child actor who played "Big Boy" in Educational Pictures' Juvenile Comedies series.

References

External links

1923 births
2006 deaths
People from Los Angeles
American male film actors
American male child actors
Male actors from California
20th-century American male actors